Cacique is a Native American title for a chief or leader; in the modern era in Spanish America, Brazil, Spain and Portugal a political boss or leader generally

Cacique may also refer to:

 Cacique (bird), several species
 Cacique (horse)
 Cacique (rum), from Venezuela
 Cacique Guaro, a brand of alcohol from Costa Rica
 Cacique, Colón, a subdivision of the Colón Province, Panama
Cacique, Distrito Nacional, a sector of Santo Domingo, Dominican Republic
 Cacique, a lingerie brand by Lane Bryant

See also
 Cassique, a proposed title for American nobility
 Cacique Nutibara Bloc, a Colombian paramilitary bloc
 Estadio Cacique Diriangén, a stadium